Summerhill or Summer Hill may refer to the following places:

Australia
Summer Hill, New South Wales, a suburb of Sydney
Summerhill, Tasmania, a suburb of Launceston
Summerhill (Mount Duneed), a prefabricated iron cottage in Victoria

Canada
Summerhill, Toronto, Ontario, a neighbourhood
Summerhill (TTC), a subway station 
Summerhill-North Toronto CPR Station, a 1916 former Canadian Pacific Railway station in Toronto

India
Summer Hill, Shimla, Himachal Pradesh

Ireland
Summerhill, Dublin, an area in the north inner city, Dublin
Summerhill, County Meath, Ireland, a village 
Summerhill House, 100-roomed mansion which demonstrated the power and wealth the Langford Rowley family
Summerhill GFC, a GAA club
Summerhill College, a voluntary secondary school in Sligo

United Kingdom
England
Summer Hill, East Sussex
Summer Hill, Sandwell, West Midlands
Summerhill, an alternative name for Somerhill House, Kent
Summerhill School, a school founded by Alexander Sutherland Neill, now located in Leiston, England
Summerhill (book), Neill's book about the school, published for American audiences
Summerhill School, a school located in Kingswinford, West Midlands, England
Northern Ireland
Summerhill, County Fermanagh, townland in County Fermanagh 
Scotland
Summerhill, Aberdeen, Scotland, a suburb
Summerhill, Dumfries, Scotland, a suburb
Summerhill, an area of Drumchapel Glasgow, Scotland 
Wales
Summerhill, Pembrokeshire, a village
Summerhill, Wrexham, Wales, a village
Summerhill, Swansea, a small housing district

United States
Summerhill (Atlanta), Georgia, a neighborhood
Summer Hill (Davidsonville, Maryland), a historic home
Summer Hill, Illinois
Summer Hill (Maynard, Massachusetts), hill, park, and highest point in Maynard, Massachusetts
Summerhill, New York, a town in Cayuga County
Summerhill, Pennsylvania, a borough in Cambria County
Summer Hill (Pittsburgh), a neighborhood
Summerhill Township, Cambria County, Pennsylvania, a township in Cambria County
Summerhill Township, Crawford County, Pennsylvania, a township in Crawford County

Other meanings
Summerhill (band), a Scottish jangle pop band
Summerhill (TV series), CBBC drama about the Summerhill School
Bill Summerhill (1915–1978), Canadian ice hockey forward

See also
Somerhill (disambiguation)